Christopher "MINK" Wingfield Morrison  is a British American film director, writer, producer and comic book novelist.

Early life
Christopher "mink" Wingfield Morrison was born in London and relocated with his parents to Los Angeles, California. Christopher attended photography college in Santa Barbara.
His graduate film about a master Los Angeles luthier placed regionally in the Student Academy Awards.

Career
Morrison's first job was as a production assistant for Walt Disney Studios, and then he earned entry-level camera department positions. He then moved to the camera division of Sony Pictures Imageworks. In the summer of 1997 he self financed wrote, produced and directed the feature film Bus, shot entirely in a Santa Monica City Bus in west Los Angeles. The film won gold at the Houston Film Festival. In 1998 he started work in the commercial/music video business working with acts like Madonna, Michael Jackson, Busta Rhymes, TLC, No Doubt, Jay-Z, Jennifer Lopez, Puffy, Nas, Beyonce, A Tribe called Quest, Will Smith as well as commercials for Coca-Cola, Gap, Nike, Reebok and many more.

This visual work led to him directing music videos for Snoop Dogg, Master P, Raphael Saadiq, Daniel Bedingfield, Lucy Pearl, South Central Cartel and Slum Village, along with Veruca Salt, Face to Face, Dead Poetic and Sheryl Crow . In 2000 he was added to the director roster at Bille Woodruff's production company Geneva Films. In 2002, Quentin Tarantino's and Lawrence Bender's A Band Apart films added him to their director roster after seeing his work.

Morrison then directed the Lionsgate action comedy Full Clip in 2003 which was released in 2006. In 2005 he directed the Sony Pictures adventure thriller Into the Sun in Tokyo and Bangkok. In 2007-2008 he was attached and developed the remake of Mortal Kombat with Larry Kasanoff producing through Threshold Entertainment and New Line Cinema . Do to film rights issues the movie never happened. In 2009 Morrison wrote and developed a feature version of Tecmo Ninja Gaiden with a prominent US / German production company..

Morrison also has written a number of creator-owned graphic novels for Image Comics, IDW Comics and Dark Horse Comics, including Dust , Dust Wars, 13 Chambers. & Shinjuku with artist Yoshitaka Amano.

In 2009, he started Twistory Entertainment Studios, a company based on his vision of new creative storytelling. Twistory Studios from 2009-2014 developed and released multiple mobile video games, a fusion art magazine and a comic book that was developed into a video game driven game show. Belle's War (the TV/game show) an original concept by Morrison started airing alongside episodes of Fox Sport's 1 World Poker Tour in the fall of 2014. In early 2015 he left Twistory Studios as the company under new leadership was renamed and completely changed the core creative to create and distribute STEM based Educational toys and web cartoons for young children.

Currently he is writing and directing new material for Film & Television.

Works

1998–2002 Videography (producer or additional photography) incomplete list

 TLC – "No Scrubs"
 Ja Rule – "Holla Holla"
 Nas feat. Puff Daddy – "Hate Me Now"
 Missy Elliott – "She's a Bitch"
 Mase feat. Blackstreet – "Get Ready"
 Noreaga – "Oh No" 
 Puff Daddy feat. R. Kelly – "Satisfy You"
 Mobb Deep feat. Lil' Kim – "Quiet Storm" (version 2: remix)
Garbage - "I Think I'm Paranoid"
Natalie Imbruglia - "Wishing I Was There" (Version 2/U.S. Version)
Lenny Kravitz - "Thinking of You"
Madonna - "The Power of Good-Bye"
Janet Jackson - "Every Time"
 Dr. Dre feat. Snoop Dogg – "Still D.R.E."
 Q-Tip – "Vivrant Thing"
 Ol' Dirty Bastard feat. Kelis – "Got Your Money"
 Sisqó – "Got to Get It"
 Jay-Z feat. UGK – "Big Pimpin'"
 No Doubt – "Ex–Girlfriend"
 Macy Gray – "Why Didn't You Call Me"
 R. Kelly – "Bad Man"
 LL Cool J – "Imagine That"
 Busta Rhymes – "Fire"
 Mýa feat. Jay-Z – "Best of Me (Holla Main Mix)"
 Roni Size & Reprazent – "Who Told You"
 Kobe Bryant feat. Tyra Banks – "K.O.B.E."
 DMX – "Ain't No Sunshine"
 Busta Rhymes feat. Kelis – "What It Is/Grimey"
 Snoop Dogg – "From tha Chuuuch to da Palace"
 Babyface – "There She Goes"
 Lisa "Left Eye" Lopes – "The Block Party"
 Jessica Simpson – "A Little Bit"
 Ginuwine – "Differences"
 FUBU feat. LL Cool J, Keith Murray, and Ludacris – "Fatty Girl"
 Busta Rhymes – "As I Come Back/Break Ya Neck"
 Method Man – "Party & Bull%#!*"
 Aaliyah – "Rock The Boat"
 N*E*R*D – "Rock Star" (unreleased version)
Queen Latifah-"Paper"
Brandy featuring Mase "Top of the World"
Usher "My Way"
Marilyn Manson "The Dope Show"
Marilyn Manson "I Don't Like the Drugs (But the Drugs Like Me)"
Everclear "Father of Mine"
A Tribe Called Quest "Find a Way"
 Hole "Malibu"
Lenny Kravitz "Fly Away"
Faith Evans featuring Puff Daddy"All Night Long"
Warren G featuring Mack 10"I Want It All"
Matchbox Twenty"Back 2 Good"
Will Smith featuring Dru Hill and Kool Moe Dee"Wild Wild West"
 Jennifer Lopez "If You Had My Love"
Lenny Kravitz"American Woman"
Enrique Iglesias"Bailamos"
 TLC "Unpretty"
D'Angelo"Untitled (How Does It Feel)"
 Jennifer Lopez featuring Big Pun and Fat Joe "Feelin' So Good"
Will Smith"Freakin' It"
Kelis"Get Along with You"
Dr. Dre featuring Snoop Dogg"The Next Episode"
Eminem"The Way I Am"
Faith Hill"Where Are You, Christmas?"
Jennifer Lopez"Love Don't Cost a Thing"
Jay-Z featuring R. Kelly"Guilty Until Proven Innocent"
Aaliyah"We Need a Resolution"
Puff Daddy"Bad Boy for Life"
Jay-Z featuring Beyonce Knowles "03 Bonnie & Clyde"
 Christina Aguilera, Mýa, Lil' Kim, and P!nk "Lady Marmalade"
 Michael Jackson "You Rock My World" Video features actors Marlon Brando, Chris Tucker, Michael Madsen, Billy Drago and introducing Kishaya Dudley

1998–2007 Videography (director) incomplete list

 Knowledge – "Clinton Youth" (Remix)
 Knowledge  "Destiny"
 Supreme beings of Lesiure "Strange love addiction"
 Face to Face  "God is Man"
 Veruca Salt  "Born Entertainer"
 Boniface  "Cheeky"
 Daniel Bedingfeld "James Dean"
 Lucy Pearl "Without You"
 Rapheal Saadiq "Still Ray"
 Rapheal Saadiq "OPH"
 South Central Cartel  "What's his name"
 Slum Village  "Call me"
 Slum Village  "1,2"
 Master P " Pocket's gonna stay fat "
 Master P " Gold's in they mouth"
 C Murder  "I don't give a what"
 C Murder  "What Cha Gonna Do"
 Soulja Slim  "Get Ya Mind Right"
 Krazy "Thugged out"
 Rondo(outlawz)  "Success before Death"
 West Coast Bad Boyz feat Snoop, WC, E-40, Doggpound, Eastsidaz "Pop Lockin"
 Amanda Perez "Candy Kisses"
 Lil Rob "One of Those Days"
 Capone  "Summertime Anthem"
 Dead Poetic  "Narcotic"
 NBC Hero's Television Show (Season 1) (Add Package)
 Sheryl Crow "Globe Sessions tour"

1998–present (director, writer or producer) filmography 

Bus (1997–98) Independent
Full Clip (2003) Lionsgate Films
Into the Sun (2005) Screen Gems Sony Pictures
Method Man : The Strip Game (2006) (Second unit Director) Lionsgate Films
Sideways (2009) (Second Unit Director) 20th Century Fox
Shinjuku (2013) Animated Short with Director Robert Valley  Independent
Golden State Warriors Championship VR Experience (2016) NBA - CAA(Creative Artists Agency)
Dust (2018) (optioned) Lionsgate Films

Television series (producer) 
"Belle's War" Pilot TV/Game show (Executive Producer - Creative) WPT/ Fox Sports 1 (2014)
"The Holtzman Presentation" PODCAST SERIES (Producer - Creative) SPOTIFY (2021,2022)

Bibliography (writer) 

Dust (with Paolo Parente, Image Comics), 2007)
13 Chambers (with Denis Medri, Paolo Parente, Image Comics), 2008)
Shinjuku (with Yoshitaka Amano, Dark Horse Comics, 2010, 2022)
Dust Wars (with Davide Fabbri, Paolo Parente, Image Comics, 2009, 2010, 2011)
"Singularity" (with Tom Mandrake, Davide Fabbri, David Atchison, Activision, 2011)
The Park ( IDW Publishing, 2018, 2019)
Full Bleed - Film Threat( To Live and Gore in L.A.) (IDW Publishing,2021)

References

External links
 Mink Morrison Instagram
 Mink Morrison IMDB
 Mink Morrison IMVDB
 Mink Morrison Comicvine

Living people
Film directors from Los Angeles
British film directors
American comics writers
Writers from London
British comics writers
Writers from Los Angeles
Year of birth missing (living people)